Cape Fourcroy is located at the western tip of Bathurst Island. Cyclone Tracy passed through here in December 1974. It is the location of Cape Fourcroy Light, an active lighthouse.

It is believed that the cape was named after Antoine François, comte de Fourcroy, on 26 July 1803 by Louis de Freycinet, on his journey on the Géographe, in Baudin's expedition to Australia.

On the 31 December 1942, a 31 Squadron Bristol Beaufighter crashed near the Cape, but both crew members were able to bale out and were rescued.

References

Landforms of the Northern Territory
Headlands of Australia